Jeffrey Naughton was a Professor and department chair of Computer Sciences at the University of Wisconsin–Madison, where he was one of the leaders of the Wisconsin Database Group. He was lead of Google's Madison office  until 2022.

Career 

Naughton received a bachelor's degree from the University of Wisconsin–Madison in 1982, and a Ph.D. from Stanford University in 1987. He was a member of the faculty at Princeton University from 1987-1989.

Professor Naughton is a Fellow of the ACM, recipient of the University of Wisconsin Vilas Award for excellence in research, and author of over 100 technical papers. In addition, he was the recipient of the Wisconsin Student ACM Chapter (SACM) "Cow Award" for excellence in classroom teaching.

Naughton joined Google in February 2016. He was a distinguished scientist and the site lead of Google Madison until 2022. He is currently a SVP and Engineering Fellow at Celonis.

References

External links 
Professor Naughton's homepage

Living people
Fellows of the Association for Computing Machinery
Year of birth missing (living people)
University of Wisconsin–Madison alumni
Stanford University alumni
Princeton University faculty
American computer scientists
Database researchers
Place of birth missing (living people)